The LSXX Tour was a series of sixty concerts by the Breeders in 2013 to commemorate the twentieth anniversary of the release of their 1993 album Last Splash.

Background 
In the early 1990s, Kim Deal was a member of both the Breeders and the Pixies; the latter broke up in 1993. When the Breeders released their second album Last Splash that same year—on 4AD Records—the group consisted of Kim and her twin sister Kelley Deal on guitar and vocals, Jim Macpherson on drums, and Josephine Wiggs on bass and vocals. The album sold well, reaching platinum status in the USA, and gold or silver in France, Australia, Canada, and the UK.

Between 1992 and September 1994, the Breeders had an intense schedule including touring and recording, and by autumn 1994 most of the band members were tired. During the Lollapalooza tour in summer 1994, Deal mentioned to those around her that she wanted her next project to be solo, "something quick and dirty, under the radar ... without the pressure of following up [Last Splashs hit single] 'Cannonball'".

That autumn and winter, Deal wrote songs inspired by her life where she lived in Dayton, Ohio, and practiced them in her basement. In November 1994, Kelley Deal was arrested on drug-related charges, and had to attend rehabilitation sessions. The following year, an opportunity for Kim Deal to record some of her new compositions came up when Guided by Voices abandoned a recording session that she was producing, and she was able to use leftover studio time. Trying to distract her sister from her drug problems, Deal recruited Kelley to play on three songs. Kelley's involvement changed Deal's mind about her current project being solo, and she began to conceptualize the album as a band release.

Wiggs chose not to work with Deal in the mid-90s—she was instead involved with multiple projects with members of Luscious Jackson—and there have been different accounts for why. In 2013, Wiggs said to interviewers including Spins Amanda Petrusich that in 1995 she had offered to rejoin if the next album would be a Breeders' release, but that she was convinced Deal wanted to do a side project. Deal told Petrusich that she had wanted to record as the Breeders in 1995, but that Wiggs declined to be involved, wishing to take some time off.

Whatever Deal's motivation, in 1995 she formed a group named the Amps, with fellow Daytonians Macpherson, Luis Lerma, and Nate Farley; Kelley had to leave the project due to her drug treatment. In 1996, Deal reformed the Breeders using the Amps' lineup of herself, Macpherson, Farley, and Lerma, as well as Carrie Bradley and Michelle Bodine. In several interviews in 1997, Deal complained that she had formed the Amps out of respect for Kelley and Wiggs, who needed time off, but that even in May 1996, around the end of the Amps' touring, Kelley and Wiggs still told her that they were not yet ready to rejoin the Breeders; Deal wished then that she had instead recruited Farley and Lerma for the Breeders in 1994 after Lollapalooza, instead of forming the Amps.

During Deal's attempted recording sessions in 1997, bandmates and studio musicians found her behavior and demanding musical standards to create a difficult working environment; members including Macpherson quit the group. Deal has recalled of Macpherson's departure that he "took his drums and I never saw him again. E-ver. And it hurt my heart, cos he’s such a great guy and I felt dumb and I’m sure he did too, whatever, we don’t even know"; Macpherson recalls that for 15 years "Kim thought I hated her, and I thought she hated me". By the time of the Breeders' next album, 2002's Title TK, Mando Lopez, José Medeles, and Richard Presley had replaced Wiggs and Macpherson; this same lineup, without Presley, performed on 2008's Mountain Battles and the Fate to Fatal EP (2009). Meanwhile, Deal joined multiple reunion tours by the Pixies between 2004 and 2011, before officially quitting this group in 2013.

Kim Deal has recalled that in the spring of 2012: "Kelley was on the couch ... and she said in a year it will be the 20th anniversary for Last Splash, and she wondered if [Wiggs and Macpherson] would do shows with us." When Kim texted Wiggs, and Kelley contacted Macpherson, they found both enthusiastic about the prospect of reuniting for a 2013 tour. Following the initial contact, there were several months of waiting before more concrete plans could be made, during which "there was a process of getting people involved, booking agents and promoters", and waiting for organizers to begin planning music festivals. The Deal sisters received the blessing of existing members Lopez and Medeles to work with Wiggs and Macpherson again.

Performances 
The Breeders performed sixty concerts in 2013 for the LSXX Tour. Prior to this, they performed a warm-up concert on March 29 at the Bell House in Brooklyn; it was noted that this date was not officially part of the tour. In addition to the Bell House show, an initial 21 tour dates for the period of May 3 to June 21 were announced. These consisted of eight performances in the USA, one in Toronto, Canada, and twelve in Europe. Concert locations that were subsequently for May and June included a May 2 show at Oberlin College in the Breeders' home state of Ohio, as well as music festivals in Alabama and in Nîmes, France. The band also later added legs of the tour in South and North America, and Australia, in July to October, and further dates in the USA in December, finishing with a New Year's Eve performance in Austin, Texas. Support bands on the tour included the Connections, Parquet Courts, Beach Day, Speedy Ortiz, and Imperial Teen.

On each date of the tour, the Breeders performed the entire Last Splash album. Another song they added later in the tour was "Walking with a Killer", which Kim Deal had originally released in 2012 as an independent solo 7" single; a full-band studio version of this composition was later released on the Breeders' 2018 album All Nerve.

Dates

Notes

Footnotes

References 

 
 
 
 
 
 
  
 
 
 
 
 
 
 
 
  
  
 
 
 
 
  
  
 
 
 
 
 
 
 
 
  
  
 
 
 
 
 
 
 
 
 
 
 
 
 
  
  
 
 

2013 concert tours
2013 in American music
Concert tours of the United States
The Breeders